is a passenger railway station in the city of Narita, Chiba, operated by the Keisei Electric Railway.

Lines
The station is served by the Narita Sky Access Line from Keisei Ueno in Tokyo to Narita Airport Terminal 1 Station. It is located between Inba-Nihon-Idai Station and Narita Airport Terminal 2·3 Station, a distance of 40.7 kilometers from Keisei-Takasago Station, and 8.4 kilometers from Inba-Nihon-Idai Station.

Station layout

Narita Yukawa is an elevated station, with the platforms located on the third floor level. The station has two side platforms on either side of four tracks. 500 meters east of the station, the tracks converge to become a single track to/from Narita Airport using a #38 high-speed turnout. The platforms are 149 m long, designed to accommodate 8-car trains.

Platforms

History
The station opened on 17 July 2010 coinciding with the start of Narita Sky Access services.

Passenger statistics
In fiscal 2019, the station was used by an average of 1,526 passengers daily (boarding passengers only).

Surrounding area
The Abiko Branch of the Narita Line passes directly under the station. However, there is no station along the line. The closest station to Narita Yukawa is Shimōsa-Manzaki.

 Narita New Town
 Chiba Prefectural Narita-Kita High School

See also
 List of railway stations in Japan

References

External links

 Station homepage 

Railway stations in Chiba Prefecture
Railway stations in Narita, Chiba
Railway stations in Japan opened in 2010
Stations of Keisei Electric Railway